Dudi Sela and Harel Srugo were the defending champions but decided not to participate.
Bradley Klahn and Michael Venus won the final against Adam Feeney and John-Patrick Smith 6–3, 6–4.

Seeds

  Adam Feeney /  John-Patrick Smith (final)
  Bradley Klahn /  Michael Venus (champions)
  Ilija Bozoljac /  Mischa Zverev (quarterfinals)
  Jarmere Jenkins /  Austin Krajicek (semifinals)

Draw

Draw

References
 Main Draw
 Qualifying Draw

Levene Gouldin and Thompson Tennis Challenger - Doubles
2013 Doubles
2013 Levene Gouldin & Thompson Tennis Challenger